This is a partial list of artworks by Pablo Picasso produced from 1971-1973. Picasso celebrated his ninetieth birthday in 1971, and remained productive until his death two years later.

1970
Picasso's Suite 156 (156 series) of 156 etchings was completed shortly before his death, having been begun in 1970.
1971
At Work (Oil on canvas, 161.9 x 130.2 cm, MoMA) 
Galerie Louise Leiris, Picasso (Lithograph, 75.8 x 50.2 cm, MoMA) 
Monument (Cor-Ten steel, (395.3 x 149.2 x 319.3 cm) including base, MoMA) 
Pirosmanachvili à son chevalet from Pirosmanachvili 1914 (Drypoint, plate: 16 x 10 cm, MoMA) 
Four Characters or The Conversation (Pencil, ink, gouache and marker on paper, 32.5 x 50 cm, Museu Picasso) 
Tête d'homme (Brush, ink and gouache on card, 28 x 21.7 cm)

References

1971-1973
Picasso 1971-1973
1970s in art